Chloromonas is a genus of green algae in the family Chlamydomonadaceae. It is closely related to the model green algae, Chlamydomonas, and distinguished mainly through the absence of a pyrenoid.

The most northerly location at which this algae has been observed is Lake Bienville, Quebec, 55°N.

Species 

 C. radiata
 C. asteroidea
 C. macrostellata
 C. reticulata
 C. oogama
 C. perforata
 C. rosae
 C. serbinowi
 C. sp. ANT3
 C. sp. ANT1
 C. insignis
 C. augustae
 C. palmelloides
 C. playfairii
 C. actinochloris
 C. carrizoensis
 C. rubrifilum
 C. sp. D-CU581C
 C. brevispina
 C. nivalis
 C. paraserbinowii
 C. pichinchae
 C. subdivisa
 C. variabilis
 C. rostafinskii
 C. cf. alpina 032-99
 C. cf. platystigma 020-99
 C. sp. 047-99
 C. cf. palatina 025-99
 C. chenangoensis
 C. sp. CU722a

References

External links

Chlamydomonadales genera
Chlamydomonadaceae